WVMB-LP (107.9 FM) is an American low power FM radio station licensed to serve the community of Madison, Alabama.  The station, established in 2004, is owned and operated as a ministry of Madison Baptist Church Inc.

Programming
WVMB-LP broadcasts a Christian radio format to Madison and Athens, Alabama. Programming includes Gospel music, teaching programs, sermons, and a limited amount of Spanish language programming.

History
In June 2001, Madison Baptist Church, Inc., applied to the Federal Communications Commission (FCC) for a construction permit for a new low-power broadcast radio station. The FCC granted this permit on November 18, 2002, with a scheduled expiration date of May 18, 2004 . The new station was assigned call sign "WVMB-LP" on December 3, 2002. After construction and testing were completed in May 2004, the station was granted its broadcast license on June 9, 2005.

References

External links
WVMB-LP official website

WVMB-LP service area per the FCC database

VMB-LP
VMB-LP
VMB-LP
Radio stations established in 2004
2004 establishments in Alabama